The 2009–10 Indonesia Super League was the second edition of this newly born competition (which replaced the Premier Division as the top rank of football system in the country.

Persipura Jayapura were the defending champions, having won their first title in the previous season, or the second title if counting the Premier Division era, equalling the record for the most top league titles, along with Persik Kediri.

The campaign began on 11 October 2009.  A total of 18 teams competed in the league, 14 of which contested the 2008–09 season and four of which were promoted from the Premier Division. The title was won by Arema Indonesia. This was their second title in their history.

Teams

Stadia and locations

Personnel and sponsoring

Foreign players

Managerial changes

League table

Standings

Positions by round

Results

Promotion/relegation play-off 
Pelita Jaya 0–0 Persiram Raja Ampat (4–2 pens)

Penalties:
   Pelita Jaya        :   Redouane Barkaoui
                          Basri Badussalam
                          Jajang Mulyana
                          Ardan Aras

   Persiram Raja Ampat  : Titus Bonai 
                          Gideon V. Way
               

Pelita Jaya promoted to the top flight

Season statistics

Top goalscorers
Source: Soccerway, LigaIndonesia.co.id

Aldo Barreto is the top goalscorer of 2009–10 ISL with 19 goals.

Hat-tricks

Clean sheets
Most clean sheets: 17 – Arema Indonesia, Persiba Balikpapan & Persija Jakarta
Fewest clean sheets: 4 – Persitara Jakarta Utara

Attendances

References

External links
 Official website 
 Soccerway
 

Top level Indonesian football league seasons
Indonesia Super League seasons
Indonesia
1